"I Need to Know" is a song written by Tom Petty and recorded by American rock band Tom Petty and the Heartbreakers. It was released in 1978 as the first single from their second album You're Gonna Get It!.  It peaked at #41 on the Billboard Hot 100 singles chart in 1978. This song as well as "Listen to Her Heart" was already being played live in concert as early as June 14, 1977, as is evidenced in a performance on Germany's music television show "Rockpalast".

Cash Box said that it is "hard driving rock 'n' roll" and that "the hook repeats hypnotically as the guitars drive the message home."  Record World called it an "energetic rocker."

Other versions
Stevie Nicks (of Fleetwood Mac) has been performing "I Need to Know" live in her solo concerts since 1981. Nicks also performed this song with Tom Petty together on Petty's 30th anniversary concert (which was filmed and released on DVD as Runnin' Down a Dream).

In 1981 the Swedish band Gyllene Tider recorded a version of the song with Swedish lyrics, written by singer Per Gessle (the male half of Roxette), named "Vill ha ett svar!"

Poison recorded a cover of the song for their 2007 album Poison'd!.

Hour of the Wolf recorded a cover for their 2012 greatest hits album, Decompositions Vol. II.

Following Petty's death on October 2, 2017, Local H have been playing the song in concert.

In 2020, Starcrawler previewed a cover of the song for Tom Petty's 70th Birthday Bash on SiriusXM, featuring Mike Campbell on rhythm guitar. The band later officially released the cover as a single on music streaming services.

All appearances
You're Gonna Get It!
Pack Up The Plantation: Live!
Greatest Hits
Playback
Anthology: Through The Years
The Live Anthology
This song is part of the soundtrack in Rock Band 3.

Charts

See also
1978 in music

References

1978 singles
Tom Petty songs
Songs written by Tom Petty
Song recordings produced by Denny Cordell
1977 songs